West Kameng (pronounced ) is a district of Arunachal Pradesh in northeastern India. It accounts for 8.86% of the total area of the state.  The name is derived from the Kameng river, a tributary of the Brahmaputra, that flows through the district.

History 

The area around the Kameng river has traditionally come under the control of the Mon kingdom, Bhutan, Tibet and the Ahom kingdom. Tibetan Buddhism got a strong foothold among the tribal groups as early as in the 7th century, where the Kachen Lama constructed the Lhagyala Gompa in Morshing.

Whenever loose control was exerted over the area, small, feudal chiefdoms ruled by the Miji and the Aka chiefs dominated control over the area. This can be evidenced in the fact that ruined fortresses like those in Bhalukpong constructed in the 10th to 12th century and the Dirang fort, which was constructed in the 17th century to defend against invasions from neighbouring chiefdoms.

Upon the arrival of the British, the entire area became what was known as the North-East Frontier Agency. It was renamed as the Balipara Frontier tract in 1919, with its headquarters at Charduar in Assam. In 1946, the district area was carved out of the Balipara, with the name Sela Sub-Agency and its headquarters continued to be Charduar of Assam.

Following the independence of India, the Sela Sub-Agency was renamed as the Kameng Frontier Division. Its headquarters were later transferred to Bomdila in 1954. However, with the invasion of Tibet in 1950, Tibetan refugees started populating the area. Furthermore, with the invasion of the Chinese troops into this area, many historical monuments were either destroyed or defaced.

The Kameng Frontier Division was renamed as the Kameng District. The Political Officer was also redesignated as the Deputy Commissioner of Kameng. However, due to political reasons, the Kameng district was bifurcated between East Kameng and West Kameng on 1 June 1980. Tawang district, which initially belonged to part of the district, was separated on 6 October 1984.

Geography
It lies approximately between 91° 30' to 92° 40' East longitudes and 26° 54' to 28° 01' North latitudes. The district shares an international border with Tibet in the north, Bhutan in the west, Tawang District in the northwest, and East Kameng district in the east. The southern border is shared with Sonitpur district and Udalguri district of Assam. The Eaglenest Wildlife Sanctuary is located in West Kameng.

Topography
The topography is mostly mountainous. Much of the West Kameng area is covered with the Himalayas.  The highest peak in the district and state is Kangte.

Climate

Like East Kameng, the West Kameng district experiences an arid tundra or a cool temperate climate in the north. Snow fall occurs from mid-November to February. Snow can be also seen in Khupi, Bomdilla, Nechiphu. Nechiphu is the highest place in the district, situated at 5690 feet above sea level.

Transport
The  proposed Mago-Thingbu to Vijaynagar Arunachal Pradesh Frontier Highway along the McMahon Line, (will intersect with the proposed East-West Industrial Corridor Highway) and will pass through this district, alignment map of which can be seen here and here.

Economy

Like most of Arunachal Pradesh, Jhum, or shifting cultivation, is practised among the tribes who live in lower elevations where there is a temperate or subtropical climate. Horticulture is practised as well.

Small industries such as textile and handicraft factories can be found.

Divisions

The district is divided into three subdivisions, Thrizino, Rupa and Bomdila, which are further divided into twelve administrative circles, namely, Dirang, Bomdila, Kalaktang, Balemu, Bhalukpong, Jameri, Singchung, Nafra, Thrizino, Rupa, Thembang and Shergaon.  The four development blocks in this district are Dirang, Kalaktang, Nafra-Buragaon, and Thrizino.

There are 4 Arunachal Pradesh Legislative Assembly constituencies located in this district: Dirang, Kalaktang, Thrizino-Buragaon and Bomdila. All of these are part of Arunachal West Lok Sabha constituency.

Demographics

Population
According to the 2011 census West Kameng district has a population of 83,947, roughly equal to the nation of Antigua and Barbuda. This gives it a ranking of 618th in India (out of a total of 640). Its population growth rate over the decade 2001–2011 was 16.64%. West Kameng has a sex ratio of 755 females for every 1000 males, and a literacy rate of 69.4%.

Language
West Kameng comprises five major tribes: Monpa (which includes Dirang, Bhut, Lish, and Kalaktang Monpa), Miji (Sajolang), Sherdukpen, Aka (Hrusso), and Bugun (Khowa).  Minority tribes include Takpa, Lishipa, Chugpa, and Butpa. All of these indigenous communities use Nefamese (an Assamese pidgin) to communicate with each other.

Religion
Most of the inhabitants are Buddhist, though the Aka, Bugun (Khowa), and Miji have indigenous religions and those tribe members follow a mix of Buddhism, Hinduism, and Donyi-Polo (a form of Animism).

Flora and fauna

References

External links 

Official website of the West Kameng district

 
Populated places established in 1946
Districts of Arunachal Pradesh
Minority Concentrated Districts in India
1980 establishments in Arunachal Pradesh